Polypterus mokelembembe is a species of the fish genus Polypterus, found in the central basin of the Congo River.

Etymology
Mokele-mbembe, a mythological creature believed by some to be a sauropod dinosaur that survived the extinction of dinosaurs in the central Congo Basin, alluding to the archaic nature of polypteriforms, which most likely are the sister group to the remaining Actinopterygii, and which probably existed at the same time as sauropods.

References

Polypteridae
Taxa named by Ulrich K. Schliewen
Taxa named by Frank Schäfer
Fish described in 2006